The Social Democratic Party (PSD) is a political party in Brazil led by Gilberto Kassab and uniting dissidents from various political parties, especially the Democrats, Brazilian Social Democracy Party and Progressive Party.

The party has become a major force for centrism in Brazil and commonly unites with both left-wing and right-wing parties. In this way, the party managed to have members occupying positions in ministries and important secretariats in the governments of presidents Dilma Rousseff, Michel Temer, Jair Bolsonaro, and Luiz Inácio Lula da Silva. As such, PSD has been considered by political scientists as a big tent party, which is part of the Centrão. Until March 2021, PSD congressmen had on average more than 90% alignment with the Bolsonaro government in terms of votes in the National Congress.

History
The party, founded in 2011 by São Paulo mayor Gilberto Kassab, was criticized by members of the opposition political parties, primarily the Democrats (DEM), as supporting the government. Many Democrats members accused the PSD of being created by Luiz Inácio Lula da Silva to destroy the DEM and deliver on a promise made to Workers' Party (PT) supporters to "exterminate the DEM from the Brazilian political scenario". The party was criticized for having a vague program, making references to economic freedom, political reform and welfare, and being hard to differentiate from other political parties except those on the hard left. According to Kassab, "We are neither a right-wing party nor a left-wing nor a centrist party".

In many Brazilian states, the PSD took a liberal stance on economics and had good election results. The party has good relationships with major political parties such as the social democratic Brazilian Socialist Party, the national conservative Progressive Party, the centrist Brazilian Labour Party, the Christian democratic Brazilian Republican Party and the progressive Citizenship. Since its inception, the party has been associated with fusions with other parties, primarily the PP and PSB. It has endured on the Brazilian political scene, and has more representation than any political party other than the major ones. The party chaired the Finance Ministry of Brazil in Michel Temer's government, and is a major force in Brazilian politics.

However, in the state of Bahia, the party is a long-term partner of the major left-wing Workers' Party, having the running mate in the gubernatorial tickets of Rui Costa and each party supporting the other in the senate elections, with Otto Alencar and Angelo Coronel being the senators of Bahia together with the Petista Jaques Wagner

The PSD supported the impeachment of Dilma Rousseff.

PSD elected several senators and some governors in the Brazilian Centro-Sul region in 2018, with the support of Jair Bolsonaro.

Ideology 
Soon after its foundation, the national president of the party, Gilberto Kassab (SP), stated: "It will not be on the right, it will not be on the left, nor on the center". The foundational purpose of the PSD is the satisfaction of the interests of the lower class that had risen to the middle class position during the Workers' Party governments. The then-vice-president of the party, Guilherme Affif Domingos (SP) wrote a document with 12 party commitments, among them:

 National Development
 Liberty
 Democracy and Regional Representation 
 The Right to Security of Property
 Equal Opportunities
 Sustainability and Technological Innovation
 Accountability and Fiscal Responsibility
 Freedom of the Press
 Free Association
 Decentralization and Federalism
 Free Trade and Defense of Traditional Values
 Individual Freedom and Responsibility

However, according to political scientist Rui Maluf, the absence of specific programmatic content reveals that the PSD has a typically catch-all organizational nature and that its foundation reflects the dissatisfaction of its staff with previous parties, mostly from the Democratas party.

Notable members 

 Gilberto Kassab, former Mayor of São Paulo and Former Minister of Science, Technology, Innovation and Communications 
 Ana Amelia Lemos, journalist, former senator for Rio Grande do Sul, and vice-presidential candidate for Geraldo Alckmin in 2018
 Rodrigo Pacheco, Senator for Minas Gerais and President of the Federal Senate
 Mara Gabrilli, Senator for Sao Paulo, and vice-presidential candidate for Simone Tebet in 2022

Election results

Presidential elections

Legislative elections

References

External links
 

2011 establishments in Brazil
Liberal parties in Brazil
Political parties established in 2011